Henri Carel Willem "Hans" Schnitger (August 5, 1915 – March 1, 2013) was a Dutch field hockey player who competed in the 1936 Summer Olympics. Schnitger was a member of the Dutch field hockey team, which won the bronze medal. He played all five matches as forward. He was born in Enschede, where he lived until his death.

External links
profile
Hans Schnitger's obituary 

1915 births
2013 deaths
Dutch male field hockey players
Field hockey players at the 1936 Summer Olympics
Olympic bronze medalists for the Netherlands
Olympic field hockey players of the Netherlands
Sportspeople from Enschede
Olympic medalists in field hockey
Medalists at the 1936 Summer Olympics